Mir Shahadatur Rahman Politician of Jessore District of Bangladesh and former member of Parliament for Jessore-2 constituency in 1988.

Birth and early life 
Rahman was born in Jhikargachha in Jessore district.

Career 
Mir Shahadatur Rahman was associated with the politics of the Jatiya Party. He was elected to parliament from Jessore-2 constituency in as an independent candidate in 1988 Bangladeshi general election.

References 

Year of death unknown
People from Jessore District
Year of birth missing
Jatiya Party (Ershad) politicians
4th Jatiya Sangsad members